The 1935–36 İstanbul Football League season was the 28th season of the league. Fenerbahçe SK won the league for the 8th time.

Season

References

Istanbul Football League seasons
Turkey
Istanbul